Zhu Fu is a fictional character in Water Margin, one of the Four Great Classical Novels of Chinese literature. Nicknamed "Sneering Tiger", he ranks 93rd among the 108 Stars of Destiny and 57th among the 72 Earthly Fiends.

Background
Zhu Fu is an innkeeper in a village in Yishui County, his hometown, while his elder brother Zhu Gui has joined Liangshan Marsh and manages an inn which is a lookout for the bandit stronghold. Zhu Fu has been a martial arts student of Li Yun, the chief constable of Yishui County.

Saving Li Kui
When Li Kui goes back to his home in Yishui to fetch his mother to Liangshan, Song Jiang is worried that he would get into trouble with his quick temper. So Zhu Gui is sent to keep a tab on Li as Yishui is also his home county. Zhu Gui stays in Zhu Fu's house while in Yishui.

As Song Jiang has expected, Li Kui's reckless nature puts him in harm's way. He exposes his identity after he killed four tigers on the Yi Ridge which had eaten his mother. He had earlier killed a highwayman Li Gui who posed as him, but the man's wife ran away having learnt that he is the famous outlaw Li Kui. When Li Kui is acclaimed as a tiger slayer in the village at the foot of the ridge, Li Gui's wife recognises him and informs one Squire Cao. Li is drugged and tied up.

The magistrate of Yishui, upon receiving Cao's report, sends chief constable Li Yun to lead soldiers to escort Li Kui to his office. Zhu Gui wants to use force to rescue Li Kui, but Zhu Fu proposes a plan. The brothers pretend to give the escort party a send-off treat over their big catch. As Zhu Fu has learnt martial arts from Li Yun, the latter, together with his men, unsuspectingly drinks the spiked wine that he offers. When the group are out cold, the Zhu brothers free Li Kui, who kills all the constables but spares Li Yun as Zhu Fu intervenes. After Li Yun comes to, he catches up with the three and fights Li Kui. Zhu Fu then interposes and emphasises to Li Yun that he has no choice but to join Liangshan. Li Yun accepts his advice.

Campaigns and death
Zhu Fu is put in charge of cooking and preparation of food and beverages for Liangshan after the 108 Stars of Destiny came together in what is called the Grand Assembly. He participates in the campaigns against the Liao invaders and rebel forces in Song territory following amnesty from Emperor Huizong for Liangshan.

After Hangzhou fell in the campaign against Fang La, Zhu Fu remains at the city to take care of Zhu Gui, who has fallen sick. Both brothers have died of illness by the time Fang is vanquished.

References
 
 
 
 
 
 
 

72 Earthly Fiends
Fictional characters from Shandong